Wai Wai is a brand of instant noodles originating in Thailand. 

The brand has been produced in Thailand since 1972 by Thai Preserved Food Factory Co., Ltd.

History
Thai Preserved Food Factory co. ltd was  founded in Thailand in 1972 by Surin Napapruekchat and seven other families. The company's managing director since 1998 has been Pricha Napapruekchat, the eldest son of the founder.

Operations

Thailand
TPFF has factories on 99 rai in tambons Om Yai and Rai Khing in the Sam Phran District of Nakhon Pathom Province and will build another in Ratchaburi.

TPFF posted revenues of 6.54 billion baht in 2017 and expects that number to rise to 10 billion baht within the next five to ten years. The company anticipates it growth of instant noodles will hit five percent in 2019, up from the average of 1–3% over the preceding three years.

References

Instant noodle brands
Dried foods
Food brands of Thailand